The "Second American Civil War" is an umbrella term used by academics in order to reclassify historical eras of significant political violence in the history of the United States as a "civil war" or, more commonly, to discuss the potential outbreak of a future civil war in the country. Discussion of a second civil war has occurred with varying degrees of frequency and sincerity since the first civil war ended in 1865.

Discussion of a possible second civil war entered the mainstream in earnest as a result of the polarizing effect of the 2016 election of Donald Trump. Many conservatives had come to express perceived grievances against the government, which they viewed as tyrannical under Democrats such as President Barack Obama and Speaker Nancy Pelosi. Meanwhile, left-leaning groups viewed Trump's election as a sign that reactionary, far-right, and extremist movements were gaining political power, warning that Trump's incendiary and antidemocratic behavior would promote political violence, while the efforts of Trump conservatives to subvert democratic norms would lead to a rise in fascism, ultra-nationalism, Christian nationalism, and white supremacy. The resulting social division is considered by most experts to be one of the most politically polarizing eras in American history.

Concerns about a civil war rose dramatically after the first impeachment trial of Donald Trump, and it continued to grow due to political turmoil. Stemming from the COVID-19 pandemic, civil unrest during the George Floyd protests, the aftermath and legal investigations related to the historically contentious 2020 United States presidential election, the poor economic conditions from the 2021–2022 inflation surge, the overturning of Roe v. Wade, and the FBI search of Mar-a-Lago. Those who see early signs of a second civil war point to trends including democratic decline and a normalization of political violence, claiming that the United States deeply resembles other countries that have broken out into civil war. Meanwhile, those who say the risk of civil war is overblown characterize such discussions as alarmist and fearmongering, pointing to significant disincentives to large-scale violence ranging from the economic to the geopolitical. Almost all observers claim a second civil war of any magnitude would incur deep costs to global stability.

Following the violent pro-Trump attack on the U.S. Capitol in 2021, an increasing number of political scientists, journalists, historians, intelligence officials, military leaders, former U.S. generals, investors, political leaders on both sides of the political divide began to raise growing concern that the United States might break into civil war. Evangelical and fundamentalist leaders, including Focus on the Family, have urged conservative Christians to prepare for civil war against the "radical left." The British progressive newspaper The Guardian suggested that America's "treasonous far-right factions" have already declared war. Some intelligence officials and journalists have asserted that the country is locked into a cold civil war between the political left and the political right that could start within the next five to ten years. Others state that the 2022 midterms or the 2024 presidential election could act as a potential fire-starter. And still others claim a second civil war may have already begun and a shooting war is inevitable. During the 2022 election cycle, several Republican candidates ran their platform on "civil war" rhetoric, with many candidates discussing violence against the left, while many Democrats warned of fascism if Republicans  take control of the government.

Polling data demonstrates growing pessimism among Americans who view the future of their country at risk of civil war. A slim majority consider the U.S. to be in a cold civil war between the political left and political right. Other polling shows that a majority of self-identified Republicans agree that "some violence may be necessary to get the country back on track" and that the "U.S. seems headed toward a civil war in the near future." It has also been demonstrated that both self-identified Democrats and Republicans have a growing tolerance for violence as a means to justify political ends. These sentiments have translated into real-world action, with a handful of mass shootings and politically motivated killings being at least partly motivated by right-wing perpetrators hoping to foment a second civil war.

Reinterpretations of past events

Division among colonists during the Revolutionary War
Some historians name the 1861–1865 war the "Second American Civil War", because in their view, the American Revolutionary War can also be considered a civil war (since the term can be used in reference to any war in which one political body separates itself from another political body). They then refer to the Independence War, which resulted in the separation of the Thirteen Colonies from the British Empire, as the "First American Civil War". A significant number of American colonists stayed loyal to the British Crown and as Loyalists fought on the British side while opposite were a significant amount of colonists called Patriots who fought on the American side. In some localities, there was fierce fighting between Americans including gruesome instances of hanging, drawing, and quartering on both sides. As Canadian historian William Stewart Wallace noted:

As early as 1789, David Ramsay, an American patriot historian, wrote in his History of the American Revolution that  "Many circumstances concurred to make the American war particularly calamitous. It was originally a civil war in the estimation of both parties." Framing the American Revolutionary War as a civil war is gaining increasing examination.

"War of Terror" during the Reconstruction Era
After the American Civil War effectively ended with the Ceasefire Agreement of the Confederacy, the federal government began a process which it called Reconstruction, leading to the Reconstruction era (1865–1877). The United States aimed to return Southern states to the Union and update the federal and state governments in accordance with the Thirteenth, Fourteenth, and Fifteenth Amendments to the United States Constitution. The post-war volatility created endemic violence in Southern states, including armed conflict. Due to the violence and severity of the social, political and constitutional challenges during the Reconstruction Era, this period in history is sometimes called the "Second Civil War". Referring to Reconstruction as a "Second American Civil War" was established by the American Experience episode "Reconstruction: The Second Civil War" and made its way to the school curriculum.

White supremacy terrorist groups emerged in the South to oppose Reconstruction, including the foundation of the Ku Klux Klan, the White League, and the Knights of the White Camelia, which consisted primarily of Confederate veterans. These organizations attempted to oppose the United States government through assassinations, intimidation of black and white Republican officials, voter intimidation, and, at times, attempted coups and insurrections such as The Battle of Liberty Place in Louisiana in 1874. Historian Clarence Walker described this period as "a war of terror" aimed at black voters and politicians, as well as whites considered "race traitors."

The Coal Wars
Some historians have interpreted the Coal Wars as constituting some form of a Second American Civil War and they also consider it to be the largest national revolt since the first Civil War ended. Starting in 1890, the informal armed rebellion began when coal workers revolted against their employers due to poor working conditions. Attempts to unionize were met with police crackdowns, resulting in several revolts and even resulting in armed battles throughout the United States. Although they occurred mainly in the East, particularly in Appalachia, there was a significant amount of violence in Colorado after the turn of the century.

The largest conflict which occurred during the revolt was the Battle of Blair Mountain in 1921. That battle was the largest labor uprising in United States history and it was also the largest armed uprising since the American Civil War. Some 10,000 armed coal miners confronted 3,000 lawmen and strikebreakers (called the Logan Defenders) when tensions rose between workers and mine management. The battle ended after approximately one million rounds were fired and the United States Army, represented by the West Virginia Army National Guard led by McDowell County native William Eubanks, intervened by presidential order. Up to 100 people were killed, and many more arrested.

The 1933 "Business Plot"
The Business Plot (also called the Wall Street Putsch and The White House Putsch) was a political conspiracy in 1933 in the United States to overthrow the government of President Franklin D. Roosevelt and install a dictator. Retired Marine Corps Major General Smedley Butler asserted that wealthy businessmen were plotting to create a fascist veterans' organization with Butler as its leader and use it in a coup d'état to overthrow Roosevelt. In 1934, Butler testified under oath before the United States House of Representatives Special Committee on Un-American Activities (the "McCormack–Dickstein Committee") on these revelations. Although no one was prosecuted, the congressional committee final report said, "there is no question that these attempts were discussed, were planned, and might have been placed in execution when and if the financial backers deemed it expedient."

Early in the committee's gathering of testimony most major news media dismissed the plot, with a New York Times editorial characterizing it as a "gigantic hoax". When the committee's final report was released, the Times said the committee "purported to report that a two-month investigation had convinced it that General Butler's story of a Fascist march on Washington was alarmingly true" and "... also alleged that definite proof had been found that the much publicized Fascist march on Washington, which was to have been led by Major Gen. Smedley D. Butler, retired, according to testimony at a hearing, was actually contemplated". The individuals involved all denied the existence of a plot. Historians have questioned whether or not a coup was actually close to execution, but most agree that some sort of "wild scheme" was contemplated and discussed.

Debate about the outbreak of a possible Second Civil War (2008–present)

A national discussion of a second civil war can be traced back to the election of Barack Obama in 2008, and increased in frequency and seriousness after the election of Donald Trump in 2016. The debate became mainstream after several socially destabilizing events in 2020–2022, most notably was the political fallout from the highly contentious 2020 presidential election.

Warning signs of a second civil war 
Those who see warning signs of a second civil war cite:

 Democratic decline, signs of anocracy, and authoritarian movements.
 The polarizing effect of a winner-takes-all two-party system 
 Radicalized citizenry with a record high gun ownership rate 
 Irreconcilable beliefs about critical issues (such as who won an election)
 Political tension within the U.S. military
 Negative economic conditions (such as growing federal debt, income inequality and the 2021-2022 inflation surge)
 A steady rise in political violence (particularly among far-right domestic terrorists) 
 A loss of faith in the legitimacy of the government
 And the normalization of open discussion of civil war

Some researchers have also posited that a civil war might break out along racial and religious lines, exacerbated by the rise of secularization and multiculturalism in America, coupled with white decline and the decline in Christianity. Less commonly, some conservative observers, including Republican politicians, claim a second civil war is being stoked by far-left and socialist movements, such as Antifa, that seek to spark a revolution, suspend the U.S. Constitution, and implement a new form of tyranny. They typically cite discredited conspiracy theories related to COVID-19 misinformation, election rigging, the deep state, or white replacement theory to justify their position.

Argument for alarmism 
Skeptics claim that the occurrence of a civil war in the modern U.S. is essentially impossible due to certain present day conditions, including:

 A lack of two organized standing armies
 An absence of clear geopolitical lines (such as North versus South)
 A vastly nonviolent majority on both sides of the political spectrum
 An absence of state-sponsored violence by political leaders
 The nation's position as the wealthiest democracy in the world (which acts as a deterrent to the cost of war) 
 Significant disincentives to interstate war (e.g. deeply shared economies across state lines)

They claim that popular discussion about war is alarmist, fearmongering, polarizing, a "failure of historical perspective," and detracts from other real problems facing the nation (such as democratic backsliding and voter suppression). Skeptics generally claim that in its present form, the current political division is a mostly nonviolent culture war that does not represent a existential risk to the continuity of government.

Other critics claim that the term "second civil war" is being used inappropriately when it is being used to describe the potential rise of political violence that does not meet the academic definition of a civil war. They also warn that mainstream talk about a second civil war could become a "self-fulfilling prophecy." Some conservative critics have also claimed that the left is stoking fear to justify censorship and "criminalize dissent."

How a conflict might manifest 

Experts state that if civil war breaks out in the United States it will look vastly different from the first civil war, often pointing to the Syrian Civil War as an example of a modern civil war.

The general consensus is that a second civil war would likely take the form of fourth-generation warfare or a low-intensity conflict. Some envision a similar event to The Troubles in Ireland, or the Years of Lead in Italy. Others, such as Republican Congressman Adam Kinzinger (R-Ill.), conceive of a second civil war as frequent acts of political assassination, mass shootings, and domestic terrorism (similar to the Gretchen Whitmer kidnapping plot in 2020 and the 1995 Oklahoma City bombing).

Lilliana Mason, a political scientist at Johns Hopkins University, stated that if a modern civil war breaks out in the U.S. it will likely grow out of a cycle of protests and counter-protests, leading to deadly confrontations similar to the Kenosha unrest shooting by Kyle Rittenhouse. Mason theorized that if a Republican state legislature rejects the results of a future election it could have a snowball effect. "The first violent event can precipitate a bunch of other violent events," she notes, adding that it could cycle into a "future in which we can't stop the violence."

Other researchers, such as Stephen Marche and Barbara F. Walter, envision a second civil war as more organized, leading to a violent insurgency against the federal and state governments. These movements would manifest as leaderless resistance, guerilla warfare, irregular warfare, or asymmetric warfare driven by white nationalist militias and antigovernmental insurgents who attempt to carve out white ethno-states from the nation.

A large-scale conflict between insurgents and the U.S. military would likely result in a president declaring emergency powers and the implementation of invasive government surveillance, lockdowns and curfews, security checkpoints, and mass detention of suspected insurgents. Others suggest a second civil war could break out within the military, resulting in a conflict much larger in scope that could be "catastrophic," leading to a collapse of the U.S. political system.

Most experts agree that any form of second civil war would have significant economic and political costs, and would have a far-reaching impact to global stability established by the Post-World War II world order.

Background (2008–present)

Presidency of Barack Obama (2008–2016)

On November 4, 2008, Barack Obama was elected as the first President of the United States with African-American ancestry. Obama appeared just before midnight Eastern Time in Grant Park, Chicago, in front of a crowd of 250,000 people to deliver his victory speech. There was no overt discussion about a Second American Civil War in response to Obama's election. However, former Texas Governor Rick Perry discussed secession at a 2009 rally while the crowd chanted "secede," but later claimed that his remarks were rhetorical.

American professor Victor Davis Hanson blamed Obama's presidency for "sharpening" conflict between "constitutionalism and American exceptionalism" and "globalist ecumenicalism." Hanson also claimed that Obama's conduct fueled racialism by stoking a "white-versus-nonwhite binary." Hanson also claimed that the Obama administration "weaponized the IRS, the FBI, the NSC, the CIA, and the State Department and redefined the deep state as if it were the Congress, but with the ability to make and enforce laws all at once," deepening political polarization. Hanson added that the impact of the Digital Revolution and "campus radicalism" had brought the country to "the brink of a veritable civil war."

David Blight, a Yale historian, also states that the "shock of events" from recent polarization "dates to Obama's election [in 2008]." However, Blight points to "a tremendous resistance from the right" as the leading cause of tension. Blight adds that "episodes of police violence" under Obama renewed racial tensions in America, stating: "parallels and analogies are always risky, but we do have weakened institutions and not just polarized parties but parties that are risking disintegration."

According to data which was collected and published by the Anti-Defamation League, Obama's 2008 election led to a surge in membership in the American militia movement, including increased membership in far-right and neo-fascist militia groups such as the Oath Keepers and the Proud Boys.

Election and presidency of Donald Trump (2016–2020)

The election of Donald Trump in 2016 was the most polarizing election since the Civil War. Speculation about a potential civil war began to circulate as a result.

Some commentators assert that the rise of Trumpism constitutes either a form of nonviolent "Second Civil War," or a possible prelude to an actual civil war. Trump's actions and rhetoric with regards to race and immigration have been highlighted for their potential to spark a civil war.

In 2019, Rebekah Mercer, a Republican political donor who financed Trump's election win, stated that the country was not "yet in armed conflict" and then, she quoted part of Abraham Lincoln's Gettysburg Address, "Now we are engaged in a great civil war". Mercer then said "One hundred and fifty-five years later, it is barely hyperbolic to echo the Great Emancipator.”

Sociopolitical crises in 2020 
In 2020, the United States faced considerable social, economic and political challenges that exacerbated pre-existing divisions brought on by Trump's election. These conflicts were driven primarily by the COVID-19 pandemic, civil unrest related to the George Floyd protests, and the contentious 2020 United States presidential election. Several political analysts have suggested that the fallout from these events caused significant division between everyday conservatives and liberals, adding that the United States strongly resembles countries that experienced civil wars in the past.

COVID-19 pandemic and response to health mandates 

Controversy arose early in 2020 in regards to government health measures used to curtail the COVID-19 pandemic. These included mask mandates, government-imposed lockdowns, and stay-at-home orders intended to stop the spread of the coronavirus. Many protests broke out from right-leaning and far-right groups, including armed militias, that perceived these mandates as a suspension of civil rights. The nationwide protests against COVID-19 measures resulted in some state capitols being stormed by militias, including in multiple times in Michigan and once in Oregon. Journalist John T. Bennett from The Independent said anti-lockdown violence constituted a form of "Second Civil War" that would escalate division between rural conservatives and urban areas in the United States.

Later, after his inauguration in 2021, President Joe Biden attempted to implement COVID-19 vaccination mandates. Some Trump supporters began flying solid black flags and black stylized American flags. These flags were historically used as a symbol of "no quarter," where a winning side of a battle refused to spare the life of a vanquished opponent (the opposite of the white flag of surrender). These flags were primarily flown by pirates in the 1800s and irregularly by Confederate troops during the American Civil War. Many commentators have interpreted these flags as an explicit threat of political violence and civil war.

George Floyd protests and race relations during Trump administration 

Nationwide protests, civil unrest and riots against police brutality erupted in America as a reaction to widely circulated bystander videos that documented the murder of an unarmed 46-year-old black man named George Floyd by a Minneapolis police officer. Even though the movement was widely nonviolent, several protests escalated into riots in major U.S. cities, resulting in estimations of $2 billion in damages, the deaths of more than 19 people, and injuries to more than 2,000 police officers.

Then-President Trump immediately characterized the movement as anarchism and labelled the rioters "Antifa" and "domestic terrorists." Trump pushed privately and publicly for a police or military "crackdown" against protestors to restore "law and order." According to White House officials, Trump was privately advocating for the military to shoot protestors. A proclamation invoking the Insurrection Act was drafted for Trump to deploy troops against protesters across the country, but was never used. Trump later denied any intention of invoking the act. Some former CIA analysts expressed fear that Trump's use of the military would trigger a national collapse.

On June 1, 2020, Trump ordered the use of tear gas against nonviolent protesters in Lafayette Square for a photo op at St. John's Episcopal Church. Many commentators at the time proclaimed this action as a strong indicator that the country was teetering towards a spike in civil violence. King University professor Gail Helt wrote: "I've seen this kind of violence.... This is what autocrats do. This is what happens in countries before a collapse. It really does unnerve me." Counterterrorism expert Marc Polymeropoulos compared Trump's response to the actions of dictators like Bashar al-Assad, Saddam Hussein, and Muammar Gaddafi. Other analysts criticized Trump for demanding that Republican governors "dominate the battlespace" of protest, as if he were describing a war zone, as well as Trump's intention to declare that the Antifa movement is a terrorist organization as a pretext for a military crackdown.

Political scientist Barbara F. Walter labelled Trump an "ethnic entrepreneur" due to his response to these protests, and his stoking of white nationalism. She claims that Trump's "fight [is] expressly about [his] group's position and his status in society," which he perceives as being threatened by out-groups. Walter compares Trump's rhetoric to the dehumanizing tactics of Slobodan Milošević and Franjo Tuđman, who helped stoke the Yugoslav Wars, Léon Mugesera, whose inflammatory anti-Tutsi speech was a driving force behind the Rwandan genocide and the Rwandan Civil War, or Omar al-Bashir, who helped start the Second Sudanese Civil War.

The demand for police reform by protesters also exacerbated tensions between citizens and several police departments throughout the country. In June 2020, a viral audio tape on which three police officers from Wilmington, North Carolina, were heard using derogatory remarks when they described black Americans, saying that "there should be another civil war to wipe them off the fucking map" was leaked. The three officers were fired after the completion of an investigation. On his first day on the job, Wilmington Police Chief Donny Williams condemned the incident and advocated police reform. It was later revealed that two of the officers had prior disciplinary issues, among them were some incidents which occurred in the 1990s.

Trump's refusal to concede the 2020 election 

On numerous occasions throughout the 2020 presidential election, then-President Trump refused to commit to a peaceful transfer of power if he wasn't re-elected. Trump began to cast doubt on the legitimacy of the election by claiming widespread election fraud by Democrats would lead to an illegitimate Biden win.

Several commentators connected Trump's undermining of the election with increases in political violence by right-wing groups, stating that the 2020 election would result in an attempted coup or civil war. Some commentators compared it to the election of 1860, which triggered the American Civil War. Historian Richard Stringer asserted that Trump's attempt to delegitimize the election was akin to a "fascist revolution."

As the election approached, activist Noam Chomsky warned a group at the Progressive International summit that without a "very clear Trump victory," the risk of civil war would be "imminent," stating: "They are strong words, which we have never heard in public voices. I am not saying it; other people are saying it. Many people have that fear. Nothing of this kind had happened in the complex history of parliamentary democracy. The megalomania that dominates the world, that of Trump, for him is no longer enough. He could not respect the Constitution and [also] do what he calls 'negotiating' for a third term."

Days prior to the election, Sky News reported a "run on guns" driven by many Americans from both political backgrounds in preparation for a possible civil war. Several suppliers of tactical gear and ammo saw a significant increase in sales.

The 2021 U.S. Capitol attack and calls for civil war by Trump supporters 

After candidate Joe Biden was announced as the winner of the election, Trump refused to concede and attempted several times to overturn the election results in his favor, including reports of allegedly discussing martial law to seize voting machines and hold a new election. When Trump's legal efforts to overturn the election results failed, he held a "Save America" rally in Washington, D.C., which brought thousands of his supporters to The Ellipse park on January 6, 2021, during the time the election results were being certified by Congress. Trump repeated unproven claims of election fraud and said, "If you don't fight like hell, you're not going to have a country any more."  A mob of Trump supporters then attacked the United States Capitol with the intent to overturn the election by disrupting the joint session of Congress assembled to count electoral votes that would formalize then President-elect Joe Biden's victory.

Discussion of civil war by Trump supporters began to circulate on social media in the days leading up to the attack, including on right-leaning platform Parler. According to trend analysis, the online conversation of civil war intensified during Trump's speech, moments before the Capitol attack. Some participants in the attack wore shirts and carried signs that read "MAGA Civil War, January 6, 2021." These shirts were also sold online after the attack. Calls for a civil war also made their way into court filings for some of the arrested capitol rioters, with prosecutors alleging that rioters tried to incite a civil war.

United States House Select Committee on the January 6 Attack 

The U.S. House Select Committee to Investigate the January 6th Attack on the United States Capitol is a select committee of the U.S. House of Representatives to investigate the attack on the U.S. Capitol. Lloyd Green, a former Department of Justice official, stated in response to public hearings, that "The US careens through a cold civil war, its feet on the gas pedal, both hands clutching the accelerator."

During the committee hearing on July 12, 2022, it was revealed that Brad Parscale, a Trump campaign manager, texted another aide the evening of January 6, 2021, stating that Trump's actions before and during the riot constituted "a sitting president asking for civil war."

Overturning of Roe v. Wade 

In June 2022, the Supreme Court of the United States overturned Roe v. Wade, effectively challenging the constitutionality of legal abortion access. Polling data consistently demonstrated that the ruling was deeply unpopular among most Americans. Some characterized it as the start of a "legal civil war" between states.

Supporters of the ruling called the decision morally right, a "victory for unborn life," and a "celebration." Meanwhile, critics claimed the ruling was an undemocratic form of Christian right minority rule that further destabilized democratic norms. Congresswoman Alexandria Ocasio-Cortez (D-N.Y.) called it the start of a judicial coup. Peter Flaherty, Chairman National Legal and Policy Center, called criticism of the court a slow-motion coup attempt by the left. The decision resulted in public celebration among conservatives, mass protests across the US, and condemnation from world leaders who characterized the decision as "appalling," "horrific," and "one of the darkest days for women's rights."

During his presidency, Donald Trump appointed three justices to the Supreme Court: Brett Kavanaugh, Neil Gorsuch and Amy Coney Barrett, giving the court a conservative majority. On May 2, 2022, a draft majority opinion from the Supreme Court case Dobbs v. Jackson Women's Health Organization, written by Justice Samuel Alito, leaked to Politico and was published online. The opinion was later ruled on June 24, 2022, overturning Roe v. Wade and Planned Parenthood v. Casey, effectively making abortion illegal in at least 26 states due to trigger laws and opening up the conversation for a federal ban on abortion.

Democratic-led states responding by protecting abortion rights (the state governments of California, New York and Vermont are seeking to enshrine the right to an abortion in their state constitutions). Meanwhile, Republican-led states began to make abortion effectively illegal. (Missouri, for example, is seeking to allow citizens to sue out-of-state providers.) The ensuing legal infighting between states has been characterized as the most divisive moment in American history since right before the American Civil War. Some have compared the ruling to the 1857 Supreme Court decision of Dred Scott v. Sandford, which helped start the civil war four years later. Historian Ariela J. Gross summarized the crisis by calling it a "failure of comity" between states, noting: “you [now] have these really stark differences over an issue involving a fundamental right, and that’s what happened in the years leading up to the Civil War.”

Throughout their individual confirmation hearings, each conservative justice, including Clarence Thomas, stated that abortion laws had precedent and that there was no political agenda to overturn them. The ruling in context of these public statements fed into the political firestorm, with some Democratic leaders demanding that the justices be impeached for perjury.

High-ranking Democrats, including President Biden and House Speaker Nancy Pelosi, claimed such a ruling threatened to destabilize national law, and characterized it as far-right, extremist, radical, politically motivated, unconstitutional and dangerous. Hillary Clinton said the decision would "kill and subjugate women." Meanwhile, conservative leaders condemned the unprecedented leak of Supreme Court brief, with some depicting it as a left-wing insurrection similar to or worse than the January 6 attack. Other conservatives characterized the leak as a coordinated "attack" and form of left-wing terrorism meant to trigger civil violence with the intention of intimidating the justices to renege on the ruling. The Daily Wire contributor Matt Walsh, a conservative political commentator, said the political fallout of the leak could "potentially plunge the nation into civil war," while former Bush aide Lloyd Green stated that a "neo-Confederate spirit" was emerging amongst far-right Republicans and that "America's cold civil war just got really hot."

A few days prior to the leak, Stephen Marche, who warned of a second civil war after the January 6 attacks, stated that overturning Roe v. Wade was the kind of event that could act as a watershed moment. Comparing such legal action to resignation of Andrew Magrath prior to the Civil War, Marche concluded: "From that moment on, there were two legal systems. All that remained was the war. A similar breakdown in the legal system of the United States is already apparent." After the overturning of Roe became official, Marche went further, stating: "The question is no longer whether there will be a civil conflict in the United States. The question is how the sides will divide, what their strengths and weaknesses are, and how those strengths and weaknesses will determine the outcome."

Michael Schaffer, senior editor at Politico, speculated that overturning Roe v. Wade has the potential of "two-nationing" the country by triggering mass immigration and the relocation of businesses along political lines, which could accelerate an "animus" for civil war. Noting that such a division doesn't "doom" the country, Schaffer observes that interstate migration currently means nominal changes such as "marginally different tax rates," but "if the ruling takes place along the lines of Justice Samuel Alito’s draft, there immediately will be an enormous practical difference between living in most red states and most blue ones. On one side of the line, you have a right; on the other, you don’t." Rachel Rebouché, dean of law at Philadelphia's Temple University, agreed, stating: "[the ruling] really strikes at the heart of the kind of cooperation and comity that states have had in the U.S., and it speaks to the divisions that are going to erupt that were the hallmark of the Civil War."

In response to the draft decision, former Secretary of Labor Robert Reich stated that the "second American civil war is already occurring," but said its current state is not a hot war but a national "divorce," wherein parties struggle to find a way to be "civil toward each other." Reich stated the court decision will accelerate the division between two population segments: the "largely urban, racially and ethnically diverse, and young" and "the rural or exurban, white and old," creating "two versions of America."

Investigation into Trump's mishandling of Top Secret Documents (2022) 

In August 2022, it was revealed that Trump was under investigation by the Federal Bureau of Investigation (FBI) for potential obstruction of justice and violation of the Espionage Act for allegedly taking TS/SCI (Top Secret / Sensitive Compartmented Information) government documents with him to his residence in Mar-a-Lago after leaving the White House. The Washington Post reported that at least some of the documents were related to nuclear weapons. The investigation came to light days after the FBI executed a search warrant, personally approved by Attorney General Merrick Garland, at Trump's Mar-a-Lago residence to retain the documents.

The resulting political firestorm resulted in a spike of violent rhetoric among Trump supporters, including renewed calls for a second civil war. Trump himself took to Truth Social to decry the investigation as a form of political persecution, making unfounded claims of evidence planting then later claiming the documents in question were declassified. The search was broadly characterized by conservative leaders as a form of political repression and an attempt to stop Trump from running for president in 2024.

On the day the FBI search was revealed by Trump the term "#civilwar" started trending on Twitter. Terms such as "civil war" and "lock and load" also spiked online among far-right users on platforms such as Truth Social, Gab and Telegram, echoing similar online trends prior to the January 6 riots. Some pro-Trump online message boards specifically referenced the 1992 Ruby Ridge standoff and the 1995 Oklahoma City terrorist attack.

Violent rhetoric also spiked among Republican politicians and mainstream conservatives, including influencer Steven Crowder who tweeted: "Tomorrow is war. Sleep well." to his 2 million followers (though he later clarified that was not calling for "literal" violence).  Meanwhile, Florida Republican nominee Laura Loomer told her followers on Telegram: "If you're a freedom loving American, you must remove the Words decorum and civility from your vocabulary. This is a WAR! And it's time to obliterate these communists. Tonight they attacked President Donald Trump. If you sit on the sidelines and refuse to act, they will attack you and your family next."

As a result of the spike in violent rhetoric the FBI began investigating an "unprecedented" number of threats against the bureau, including plots for armed rebellion, "general civil war," targeted assassination of government officials, and at least one plot using a dirty bomb. Trump supporters gathered in protest in front of Mar-a-Lago and in front of FBI offices in Phoenix, Arizona and Washington D.C.. Over the next couple days, additional protests continued outside Mar-a-Lago and outside FBI offices in Columbia, South Carolina, Myrtle Beach, Palm Springs and Riverside, California. One Trump supporter posted a call to war on social media before attempting to breach an FBI field office in Cincinnati where he was fatally shot by law enforcement officials after attempting to flee the scene. Another supporter in Mercer County, Pennsylvania was arrested for threatening to kill FBI agents. Another individual drove his car into a barricade outside the U.S. Capitol in Washington, D.C., fired shots in the air, then committed suicide as police approached him, though motive was unclear.

In response to the spike in violence, Trump allegedly sent a cryptic message to Garland, stating: “The country is on fire. What can I do to reduce the heat?" Trump later warned that his supporters were "angry" and that "terrible things are going to happen" because "the people of this country are not going to stand for another scam." Some interpreted Trump's remarks a veiled threat. Robert Maguire, a research director at the nonpartisan Citizens for Responsibility and Ethics in Washington, for example, characterized Trump's rhetoric as threatening to "fan the flames of violence" if the FBI didn't relent in their investigation. Trump reiterated his warning in September during an interview with conservative talk radio host Hugh Hewit, stating Americans would not tolerate his indictment, and that the country would face “problems the likes of which perhaps we’ve never seen" if it happened. Asked if he felt his comment might incite people to violence, Trump responded: "That’s not inciting. I’m just saying what my opinion is. I don’t think the people of this country would stand for it.”

As the investigation heated up towards the end of August, Trump later went on Truth Social to call to be reinstated as president or hold a "new election," while also asking some FBI agents to "not take it anymore" and go "nuts." Trump also demanded that the Department of Justice stop investigating him, and characterized alleged underreporting of the Hunter Biden laptop controversy as evidence of election interference by the FBI. Sen. Lindsey Graham (R - S.C.) suggested there would be "riots in the street" if Trump is criminally indicted.

Battle for the Soul of the Nation speech 

On September 1, 2022, President Joe Biden gave a prime-time speech at Independence Hall in Philadelphia. In the speech, Biden characterized Trump and "MAGA Republicans" as stoking political violence, and labelling them a threat to "the very foundations of our republic." The speech was noted for deviating from Biden's typical approach towards compromise and bipartisanship. For several weeks prior to the speech Biden had also begun to characterize the extreme wings of the Republican Party as fascist.

Some observers remarked that the speech took a "wartime" urgency evoking concerns of a second American Civil War. In response to the speech, far-right actors renewed calls for a civil war. MSNBC journalist Tiffany Cross stated a civil war "may have already begun" in response to the speech.

Some speculated that the speech came out of a meeting Biden held with several historians a few weeks prior, many of whom warned the President that the current political climate echoed that of pre-Civil War America, as well as that of the 1930s and 1940s by pro-fascist movements before World War II.

Many Democrats praised the speech, while most Republicans condemned the speech as either offensive, divisive or evil. Some Congressional leaders characterized Biden as a dictator similar to Adolf Hitler. Trump himself called Biden an "enemy of the state." Some Trump supporters called for political violence, including assassination of Biden, Attorney General Merrick Garland, Treasury Secretary Janet Yellen and Secretary Alejandro Mayorkas.

Attempts to foment a Second Civil War 
In the late 1960s, Charles Manson, a white supremacist, led the Manson Family into becoming a doomsday cult fixated on the idea of an imminent apocalyptic race war between America's Black population and the larger White population. Manson told some of the Manson Family that Black people in America would rise up and kill all White people except for Manson and his "Family", but that they were not intelligent enough to survive on their own; they would need a White man to lead them, and so they would serve Manson as their "master". Various murders and other crimes attributed to the Manson Family have been examined as part of a scheme to incite a national race war of the type envisioned.

Lone wolf attempts to trigger a civil war 

There have been a handful of mass shootings which were motivated, in part, by an attempt to trigger a second civil war. These shootings were lone wolf attacks who typically targeted political opponents, ethnic or religious groups and critical infrastructure. They include:

 The 2017 Congressional Baseball Shooting
 The 2015 Charleston church shooting
 The 2018 Pittsburgh synagogue shooting
 The 2019 El Paso shooting
 The 2022 Buffalo shooting

Militia movement and attempts to trigger civil war 
There have also been more organized attempts beyond lone wolf terrorism by far-right militias:

 In late 2020, 14 members of the Wolverine Watchmen, an offshoot of the Michigan Militia, were arrested for plotting to kidnap the Governor of Michigan in an effort to start a second civil war that would "lead to societal collapse." 
 A U.S. intelligence report claimed that the Boogaloo movement, a far-right accelerationist group, was active in the George Floyd protests. This movement included both radical antigovernmental activists and white supremacists who seek to undermine race relations in order to trigger a second civil war.
 In January 2022, former Army veteran Christopher Arthur of Mount Olive, North Carolina was arrested by the Department of Justice for "teaching another individual how to make and use an explosive, knowing that the individual intended to use that instruction in the attempted murder of federal law enforcement." Law enforcement claimed Arthur had been training a "militia extremist" named Joshua Blessed, who was urging people to "repent of sins, and live and die for Yahweh as one of his soldiers" in a second civil war. Blessed was killed in a shootout with police in 2020 after a chase, and cell phone data showed he was working with Arthur to learn how to build and use IEDs. Arthur claimed to be training civilians to prepare for a civil war.
 In February 2022, the Department of Justice arrested three white supremacists for an alleged plot to attack the power grid in three sections of the country with the intent to trigger civil war along racial lines.

Accusations of Antifa-led civil war 
In October 2017, a conspiracy theory claiming that antifa groups were planning a violent insurrection or civil war the following month spread on YouTube and was advanced by far-right figures including Alex Jones, Lucian Wintrich, Paul Joseph Watson, and Steven Crowder. The basis for the conspiracy theory was a series of protests against Donald Trump organized by the group Refuse Fascism. The protests passed off as planned without causing significant disruption.

Discussion about a civil war at Trump rallies 

There have been a few recorded instances in which Trump's supporters either predicted or threatened to wage a second civil war during several of Trump's rallies, particularly after Trump lost the 2020 election. "Civil War" trended again on Twitter in 2021 after a video of a Trump supporter predicting civil war at an Iowa rally went viral.  MSNBC reporter Gary Grumbach added that the supporter's call for civil war was echoed at several Trump rallies as a general consensus.

Conroe, Texas Rally 
A Trump rally in Conroe, Texas on Jan. 29, 2022, drew significant attention when Donald Trump openly criticized the United States House Select Committee on the January 6 Attack, which was considering a criminal referral in relation to Trump's connection to the attack, and several investigators who were looking into his conduct during the 2020 election. Trump claimed Fulton County district attorney, Fani Willis, New York Attorney General Letitia James, prosecutor Alvin Bragg, and Rep. Bennie Thompson (D - Miss.), chairman of the select committee, were racists. Trump stated: "If these radical, vicious, racist prosecutors do anything wrong or illegal, I hope we are going have, in this country, the biggest protest we have ever had in Washington, D.C., in New York, in Atlanta, and elsewhere, because our country and our elections are corrupt." Many commentators pointed out that Trump's rhetoric around race was particularly troubling, and interpreted it as an attempt to undermine the criminal investigations. Willis, who stated she began to receive racist threats after the Conroe rally, requested security assistance from the FBI field office in Atlanta.

Trump also claimed that supporters who were arrested in relation to the January 6 riot were being "treated so unfairly," suggesting that he will offer presidential pardons to rioters if he is re-elected in 2024. Trump further claimed that all investigations into his personal conduct, as well as investigations into The Trump Organization, were an ongoing organized conspiracy "to put me in jail."

Writing for the Philadelphia Inquirer, columnist Will Bunch interpreted the Conroe rally as unlike prior rallies, noting: "Trump's incendiary remarks in Conroe sound like a call for a new civil war — naming both the locales and the casus belli."

Florence, South Carolina Rally 
In March 2022, Trump again drew significant attention when he told supporters to "lay down their lives," stating:Getting critical race theory out of our schools is not just a matter of values, it's also a matter of national survival. We have no choice…. The fate of any nation ultimately depends upon the willingness of its citizens to lay down — and they must do this — lay down their very lives to defend their country…. If we allow the Marxists and communists and socialists to teach our children to hate America, there will be no one left to defend our flag or protect our great country or its freedom. Some commentators stated that Trump's language was incendiary because it was provoking the start of a civil war along racial lines.

Online attempts to foment civil war 
Limited digital efforts to spark or show support for a civil war have also occurred; the hashtags #CivilWar2 and #CivilWarSignup, for instance, trended on Twitter in support of comments which were made by United States President Donald Trump following his impeachment by the House of Representatives in December 2019.

Motivation for starting a civil war 
A proliferation of conspiracy theories involving domestic actors, like the deep state, the great replacement, and the QAnon movement, have been argued as factors that could spark a civil war. Former Secretary of Labor Robert Reich has argued that deep state theories could serve as an ideological justification for an insurgency supported by the U.S. Armed Forces. Political scientist and specialist in civil wars Barbara F. Walter has argued that an increase in domestic terrorism (such as the 2018 Pittsburgh synagogue shooting) and a high rate of gun violence in the United States could be indicators of an impending second civil war.  Citing the QAnon conspiracy movement and Alex Jones specifically, Walter notes: "those who can make you believe absurdities can make you commit atrocities."

Saqib Bhatti, the co-executive director of the Action Center on Race & the Economy, claims that "civil war rhetoric" is being stoked by "fascist billionaires" who have "bankrolled and fueled the rise of violent white supremacist and authoritarian forces in this country.” Bhatti points to the Mercer family specifically for helping fuel hate by funding Donald Trump, Parler, and Cambridge Analytica, stating: "[Rebekah] Mercer is not warning us against armed conflict, she is threatening us with it.”

Claims that the United States is already engaged in a Cold Civil War (2020–present) 

Several experts and commentators claim that the United States is already engaged in a cold civil war and they also claim that a violent civil war could erupt in the future. Discussion of a cold civil war was sparked primarily by the election of Donald Trump in 2016 and the subsequent political fallout. Financial Times journalist Edward Luce sums up the national mood by stating: "when one party loses, its voters feel as though their America is being occupied by a foreign power." Gregory Treverton, former chairperson of the National Intelligence Council, and Karen Treverton, former Special Assistant at the RAND Corporation, go further, stating: "it seems plain that a civil war is coming, and the only question is whether it will be fought with lawsuits and secessions or with AK-15s."

Thomas E. Ricks argued in a 2017 article for Foreign Policy that the current political tensions in the United States could escalate to asymmetric or irregular warfare with the help of radicalizing digital propaganda, and speculated that "the likelihood of a second U.S. civil war in the next five years is between 20 and 40 percent, but trending upward significantly."

Investigative journalist Carl Bernstein claimed early into the Trump presidency that news of Russian interference in the 2016 United States elections had put the country in a "cold civil war." Later that year, in response to the formal impeachment inquiry against President Trump during the 2019 Trump-Ukraine scandal, conservative talk radio host Rush Limbaugh claimed, without evidence, that the Democratic Party and the mainstream media had "aligned" to overturn the 2016 election results and protect "the deep state," pushing the United States into a "cold civil war."

During the Special Counsel investigation by Robert Mueller, Sean Hannity also claimed on his radio show that there was a conspiracy to remove President Trump from office, which would result in a civil war "in terms of two sides that are just hating each other." Bernstein later stated that conservative conspiracies and attempts to delegitimize the 2020 election, including disproven claims of mass voter fraud and an alleged conspiracy by a deep state government to force Trump out of power, were "radicalizing" members of the Republican Party and bringing a civil war "closer and closer to ignition." He added after the election that Trump's actions created a "cultural civil war such as we've never seen since 1860 to 1865."

Bernstein later compared Trump to Confederate President Jefferson Davis, stating: "You'd have to go back to the civil war to think of anything like the insurrection at the Capitol on January 6. You'd have to go back to [Confederate leader] Jefferson Davis, who was a Democrat, if you’re looking for a seditious leader of a faction of the country."

Former U.S. National Security Council official Fiona Hill, who testified in the first impeachment of Donald Trump, said the radicalization of conservatism, which resulted in the 2021 U.S. Capitol attack, was a clear indicator that the nation is taking "darker turns," and summarized the cold civil war concern by stating: "The United States is teetering on the edge of violence here. We're already, I think, in a cold civil war. We've got a chance now to turn this around. But if we don't take it, we're heading down that autocratic path that we've seen in other countries."

Keith Boykin, co-founder of the National Black Justice Coalition, argues that white decline in the United States, coupled with Trump's stolen election claims, is the primary cause of a "cold civil war." Boykin states Trump created fear among many White Americans that their political power was being destroyed by diversity. New York Times journalist Charles M. Blow also identified white decline as a primary reason the country is "on the verge of another civil war."

After the Supreme Court rescinded the constitutional protection of abortion rights, stemming from United States v. Texas in 2021, Blow stated that if a civil war breaks out it would be fought between "a white racist patriarchy" and anyone who stood up to it, adding that the conflict would likely have "spats of violence" instead of organized battlefields, and would be primarily "fought in courts, statehouses and ballot boxes." Other scholars have identified perceived white displacement as the "root cause" of a pre-civil war climate.

Ryan Williams, president of the conservative Claremont Institute, took the opposite view, claiming that the rise of multiculturalism and secularism was responsible for pushing the country towards civil war, not conservative Christianity. Williams claimed that the authors of the Constitution saw the country as "really only fit for a Christian people," putting it at odds with "woke, social-justice anti-racism" movements. Williams claimed that a form of anti-Christian "woke totalitarianism" was rising in the country and stood in direct opposition to principles like constitutionalism and limited government, adding that the United States is "more divided now than we were [in the 1860s]." Williams said the "ideal endgame" is for conservatism to maintain a slim majority, and to "effect a realignment of our politics and take control of all three branches of government for a generation or two." Journalist Stephen Marche views William's "endgame" with concern, stating: "The moment the [political] right takes control of institutions, they will use them to overthrow democracy in its most basic forms; they are already rushing to dissolve whatever norms stand in the way of their full empowerment. The right has recognized what the left has not: that the system is in collapse. The right has a plan: it involves violence and solidarity."

Several journalists have also warned that a civil war is possible in the coming decade. Journalist Robert Evans, who investigates global conflict and online extremism for Bellingcat, has also warned that a civil war is imminent. Evans dedicates a podcast called "It Could Happen Here" to the subject, in which he speculates on possible scenarios of a Second American Civil War.

Other political and social commentators acknowledge that extreme partisan politics on Capitol Hill, accompanied by related commonplace verbal and occasional physical acts of aggression in the streets, plus an increased general hostility, are tearing apart the fabric of American society, but point to the fact that "culture wars cycles" are imminent to the process of replenishing American values, and the first such cycle started after George Washington's retirement, and that Americans have to find "America's middle again and return to civility."

Terrorism expert Brian Michael Jenkins echoed this view by stating that a civil war is unlikely (though not impossible), and that a possible rise in political violence, such as assassination attempts and armed conflict, was not uncommon from other periods in American history, concluding that "the country has a high tolerance for [political] violence without breaking apart." Larry Jacobs, director of the Center for the Study of Politics and Governance at the University of Minnesota, disagrees, stating that, while Americans tolerate political violence to some extent, "violence [is] being given an explicit political agenda. That's a kind of terrifying new direction in America.”

Conservative radio host Dan Bongino told his listenership in 2021 that conservatives need "to understand we are in a war and we then act accordingly," characterizing it as an existential "zero sum" situation of "we win, you lose." Citing an article from nationalist conservative news and opinion website American Greatness, Bongino stated: "First, you must understand that you are, in fact, at war. Wartime requires very different rhetoric, strategy, and people than peacetime. Trump is a wartime leader." Ginni Thomas, wife of Supreme Court Justice Clarence Thomas, recommend Bongino to Trump for United States Secretary of Homeland Security if Trump is reelected in 2024.

Trump's arrest as a firestarter 

As criminal inquires ramped up into Trump's attempts to remain in power, some legal observers raised the prospect that Trump could be arrested at the conclusion of two main investigations:

 The United States House Select Committee on the January 6 Attack, which has no power to arrest, has suggested that it may make a criminal referral to the Department of Justice. There has not been a clear indication from Attorney General Merrick Garland if he will pursue criminal charges against Trump. Garland could pursue criminal charges without a referral from the Select Committee.
 A Georgia criminal investigation looking into Trump's attempt to overturn the state election results, particularly in reference to the Trump–Raffensperger phone call.

Legal experts believe that Trump could be prosecuted on charges which are related to the obstruction of an official proceeding, conspiracy to defraud the United States, seditious conspiracy, or, in the Georgia investigation, racketeering.

Former federal prosecutor Barbara McQuade speculated that Trump's arrest could trigger a violent response from Trump supporters and could trigger a second civil war. Claire Finkelstein, a professor of law and philosophy and the founder of the Center for Ethics and the Rule of Law at the University of Pennsylvania, believes that we "may be on the brink of mass violence" which could be triggered by a Trump arrest, but she adds that prosecuting Trump is "the right thing to do" even if it starts a civil war.

Trump himself has primed his base to massively protest in major U.S. cities if he is arrested.

Secession as a firestarter 

There have been a handful of attempts by states to secede from the union since the election of Donald Trump in 2016. Most legal experts note that secession is illegal as a result of a 1868 ruling from the Supreme Court and would likely result in war.

The Yes California Independence Campaign received an increase in support in the aftermath of Trump's election, which organizers saw as a "tipping point" and a "crossroads" for the nation. The movement pushed unsuccessfully for the state to secede from the rest of the country. Though the movement never legitimized in the mainstream, historian Richard Stringer called the level of talk of secession in the aftermath of Trump's election "unprecedented" in American politics. Stringer asserted that the political climate after the 2016 election was similar to the climate preceding the American Civil War, stating: "When Lincoln was elected in 1860, the defenders of slavery concluded that their time had run out. In the 1980s, Ronald Reagan and his supporters exulted in their vision of 'morning in America.' In 2017, we might very well be moving toward the stroke of midnight."

In the summer of 2022, The Republican Party of Texas released a final Report of the Permanent 2022 Platform & Resolutions Committee. Several line items of the platform are being voted on by Texas Republican leaders. Within the party platform, the Texas GOP claims that President Biden is only "acting President" because his 2020 win was "illegitimate." The party platform also went further, stating that "the federal government has impaired our right of local self-government" and that "federally mandated legislation that infringes up on the 10th Amendment rights of Texas should be ignored, opposed, refused, and nullified." The platform also claims Texas has the right to secede from the United States and called on the Texas Legislature to put secession to a vote in 2023.

Richard Albert, a professor of law and government and the director of Constitutional Studies at the University of Texas at Austin, stated that if Texas broke away from the Union it "would mean war."

2022 or 2024 elections as a firestarter 

There has been growing concern among some observers that either the 2022 midterm elections or the 2024 presidential election will trigger a civil war in the United States, particularly if Donald Trump (or a Trumpian figure) loses but fights the 2024 election results. Economist Umair Haque, for example, has argued that primary victories for Trump-endorsed candidates during the 2022 midterm elections demonstrates that the Trump wing of the Republican party has moved from a "neo-fascist rabble" to "an organized, sophisticated authoritarian-fascist political bloc" that ensures future "far more effective" coup attempts that could trigger civil war and split the U.S. military into warring factions.

Ray Dalio suggests there is a high chance that there will be disagreement between the federal government and conservative states over results from the 2022 midterm elections, and that there is a "reasonable chance" that one of the major parties will reject the results of the 2024 election, regardless of outcome, adding that state legislators could use newly enacted voting restrictions to alter election results in favor of their preferred candidate. Dalio suggests such a result could trigger an unprecedented breakdown of law between the federal and state government, including the possibility of civil conflict, stating: "It will be power that will determine how that goes down." Dalio later clarified that such a "civil war" could be a nonviolent breakdown of federal rules, though did not dismiss the possibility of widespread political violence. Thomas Homer-Dixon, Canadian political scientist, agreed that U.S. elections are "becoming increasingly ungovernable", suggesting that the nation could descend into civil war if the 2024 election is won or contested by Donald Trump. He adds that by 2030 "the country could be governed by a right-wing dictatorship", drawing several political and economic comparisons between the contemporary United States and the final years of Germany's Weimar Republic.

Rep. Jamaal Bowman, (D-N.Y.) predicted that a heavy GOP victory in the 2022 midterms would embolden far-right extremists and rally them to ignite a race-driven civil war, stating: "That is what’s at stake right now in terms of this election."

Robert Kagan, co-founder of the neoconservative think-tank Project for the New American Century, wrote in The Washington Post, that if Trump runs for a second term, that the country will face its "greatest political and constitutional crisis since the Civil War". Kagan asserted that there is "a reasonable chance over the next three to four years of incidents of mass violence, a breakdown of federal authority, and the division of the country into warring red and blue enclaves". Former policy advisor Fiona Hill echoed Kagan, stating that a Trump victory in the 2024 presidential election, even if legally won, has the potential of triggering an "open civil war".

James Hawdon, director of the Center for Peace Studies and Violence Prevention at Virginia Tech, echoed the concern for future elections, stating: "I don't like to be an alarmist, but the country has been moving more and more toward violence, not away from it. Another contested election may have grim consequences", adding: "there are similar sentiments [to just before the American Civil War] about the seriousness of the threat and the need to take arms to 'defend' the country".

Edward Luce of the Financial Times adds: "America’s armed forces today cannot be outgunned. Even in a country that, uniquely, has more privately owned guns than people (at more than 400 million), many of which are military-grade, it would be no contest. Yet, America, of all countries, knows that asymmetric warfare is unwinnable. Think of Vietnam, Iraq and Afghanistan."

Remarks about a Second Civil War by government officials

Among Republicans 
Some members of the Republican Party have publicly suggested a second civil war in America, with a handful calling for secession, a civil war, or both. These calls for violence have been primarily in response to the First Impeachment of Donald Trump, and later in response to Trump's loss in the 2020 election, which many party leaders claim was stolen despite a lack of evidence and several refuted claims of voter fraud.

Former House Representative Steve King (R-Iowa), for instance, posted a much-criticized Internet meme on March 19, 2019, reading: "Folks keep talking about another civil war. One side has about 8 trillion bullets, while the other side doesn't know which bathroom to use."

After the opening of the first impeachment inquiry in Sept. 2019, President Trump made a Twitter post paraphrasing evangelical Christian pastor and Fox News contributor Robert Jeffress, stating: "If the Democrats are successful in removing the President from office (which they will never be), it will cause a Civil War-like fracture in this nation from which our country will never heal."

In December 2020, after the Supreme Court refused to hear Texas v. Pennsylvania, a lawsuit regarding unproven claims of fraud in the 2020 elections, Texas GOP Chair Allen West criticized the Court's decision and suggested "law-abiding states" should secede. West faced widespread criticism, including from Republican Congressman Adam Kinzinger and Democratic Senator Brian Schatz. The official Arizona Republican Party Twitter account went further, encouraging Republican voters to prepare to "fight," and asking them if they were ready to "die for something." Around the same time, Kelli Ward, chair for the Arizona Republican Party, tweeted at Trump, urging him to "cross the Rubicon" (a reference to the Roman Civil War). Trump's former National Security Advisor Michael Flynn retweeted Ward's call.

Days prior to the 2021 Capitol attack, the website for the St. Croix County Republican Party in Hudson, Wisconsin called on conservatives to "prepare for war." John Kraft, chairman for the county party, also posted on his personal Facebook page that it had "never been clearer that we are absolutely at war with the left." Kraft refused to remove the Facebook message and later resigned under pressure. The message was later removed from the website after condemnation from state conservatives. Members of the county party later released a statement condemning the call to war, stating that Kraft had posted it on their website without their consolation or approval.

In May 2021, U.S. Representative Matt Gaetz (R-Fl.) told a crowd of Trump supporters at an "America First" rally that "we have a Second Amendment in this country and I think we have an obligation to use it... it's about maintaining within the citizenry the ability to maintain an armed rebellion against the government if that becomes necessary." The crowd applauded and cheered these remarks. Gaetz later denied that he was encouraging political violence and that his words were taken out of context.

Later in August, Congressman Madison Cawthorn (R-N.C.), drawing on claims that the 2020 United States presidential election had been stolen by Democrats, stated that "if our election systems continue to be rigged and continue to be stolen, it's gonna lead to one place, and it's bloodshed." Cawthorn also added: "And I will tell you, as much as I'm willing to defend our liberty at all costs, there's nothing that I would dread doing more than having to pick up arms against a fellow American." Cawthorn later echoed this sentiment following the Kyle Rittenhouse verdict, using social media to call on his supporters to "be armed, be dangerous and be moral," which some interpreted as incendiary.

In October 2021, U.S. Representative Marjorie Taylor Greene (R-Ga.) tweeted a poll asking her followers if the United States was ready for a "national divorce" based on the party majority of each state, which many commentators interpreted as incendiary and provocative of political violence and civil war. In December 2021, Greene reinforced her call for a "national divorce" and "dismantling" of the U.S. government, but stated she was not advocating for war. Her statements prompted Rep. Jamaal Bowman (D-N.Y.) to claim that Greene was "toying with the idea of civil war" and called for her expulsion from Congress. Meanwhile, Rep. Ruben Gallego (D-Ariz.) tweeted: "There is no 'National Divorce' either [Greene is] for civil war or not," adding: "Just say it if you want a civil war and officially declare yourself a traitor." Greene later went on the America First radio show with Sebastian Gorka and said that the right to bear arms was established to allow citizens to violently overthrow tyrants, stating that 2022 Georgia gubernatorial candidate Stacey Abrams and the Democratic Party writ-large were using the power of the federal government to curtail state's rights, stating: "I hate to use this language, but Democrats ... they're doing exactly what our Founders [warned] about." Greene stated that she was not a "violent person," preferring a secession instead of open civil war.

In February 2022, the Republican National Committee voted to censure Representatives Kinzinger and Liz Cheney, the two Republicans on the United States House Select Committee on the January 6 Attack, and issued a controversial statement, claiming the representatives were "participating in Democrat-led persecution of ordinary citizens engaged in legitimate public discourse," though later claimed their statement did not endorse political violence. Kinzinger was critical of the RNC for legitimizing the attack and standing by Trump, and said such statements were a "defining moment" that put the country on course for a civil war. He continued by stating it was "not a far thought" that "someday, some militia shows up somewhere to do something, and then some counter-militia shows up, and truly at that point that is how you end up in a civil war." When pushed if he actually believed civil war was possible, Kinzinger stated: "I do. And a year ago I would have said no, not a chance. But I have come to realize when we don't see each other as fellow Americans, when we begin to separate into cultural identities, when we begin to basically give up everything we believe so we could be part of a group, and then when you have leaders that come and abuse that faithfulness of that group to violent ends, as we saw on January 6, we would be naïve to think it's not possible here." Kinzinger later went on The View to echo his concern about civil war, stating: "In the past, I've said, oh, we don't want to talk about it, because I don't want to make it likely. Well, let's look at where we are." Kinzinger also clarified that such a violent conflict would look less like historical civil wars and more like fourth-generation warfare with "armed groups against armed groups, targeted assassination and violence. That's what a 21st and 20th century Civil War is."

During the 2022 midterm election season, Florida Governor Ron DeSantis stated that if Democratic gubernatorial candidate Stacey Abrams won the 2022 Georgia gubernatorial election there would be a "cold war" between the states of Florida and Georgia. DeSantis declared: "I can’t have Castro to my south and Abrams to my north, that would be a disaster." Prior to the 2022 election season, DeSantis drew concern from Democratic congressional leaders when he proposed reactivating a state defense force called the Florida State Guard that he would control. State Sen. Annette Taddeo claimed DeSantis was a "wannabe dictator trying to make his move for his own vigilante militia like we've seen in Cuba." Rep. Charlie Crist claimed DeSantis was creating “his own handpicked secret police."

Originally budgeted at $3.5 million in DeSantis' "Freedom First" proposed budget, the Florida State Senate later proposed $10 million to train 400 initial civilians to response to state disasters without being "encumbered by the federal government." The propose budget would establish DeSantis as a "Adjutant General," with plans to expand the budget. Others assert that the fear of a "private army" ruled exclusively by DeSantis was exaggerated and that state guards can be legally federalized by the president under such laws as the Insurrection Act.

Georgia gubernatorial candidate David Perdue echoed similar sentiments during a debate with Republican Governor Brian Kemp when he accused Kemp of bringing the country "to the brink of war" by allowing "radical Democrats to steal our election." Kemp faced heated criticism from Trump and other Republicans for enforcing state law and certifying the election results in favor of Biden.

Donald Trump, having been banned from most major social media platforms after the January 6 attacks, took to his platform Truth Social on May 22, 2022, and "ReTruthed" (similar to retweeting) an ambiguous reference to civil war. The post contained a screencap of El Salvadorian President Nayib Bukele discussing inflation, stating: "the most powerful country in the world is falling so fast, that it makes you rethink what are the real reasons. Something so big and powerful can't be destroyed so quickly, unless the enemy comes from within," with another statement from a Truth Social user stating "Civil war." The post was condemned by Kinzinger and Democratic Rep. Eric Swalwell who interpreted it as advocating for a real civil war.

Republican Senator Mitt Romney, an outspoken critic of Trump, wrote an op-ed in The Atlantic on July 4, 2022 (Independence Day) warning Americans of "cataclysmic" outcomes based on poor political leadership in both political parties, and denialism of emerging problems such as national debt, climate change and illegal immigration. Romney specifically cited conservative former federal appellate judge J. Michael Luttig's opening statement to the United States House Select Committee on the January 6 Attack as a dire warning of a "potentially cataclysmic threat." Luttig stated: "Serious thinkers about the American experiment, who are not given to apocalyptic prophesying, question whether America is on the verge of a literal civil war."

Among Democrats and others 

There have been no public calls for civil war from any other political party, though some have expressed concerns that increased polarization will lead to a civil war.

Several Democrats have blamed Trump and members of the Republican Party for pushing for civil war.

During the second impeachment of Donald Trump, Rep. Maxine Waters (D-Cali.) claimed Trump was "capable of starting a civil war." A year later, she echoed this view, stating that domestic terrorist organizations were being encouraged by Trump in the way "he speaks to them ... in the way he encourages them. And so, we're in for it ... These people have lost their minds. They are crazy. And people had better understand that democracy is being damaged and undermined. And I believe they would like to see a civil war in the country."

Presidential candidate Senator Bernie Sanders (I-Vt.) remarked in 2020 that Trump's response to the COVID-19 pandemic had put the country "in the worst moment in American history maybe since the Civil War."

Presidential candidate Andrew Yang, who ran in the 2020 Democratic primary and later established the Forward Party political action committee, has become increasingly vocal about his concerns for a second civil war, tweeting in October 2021: "Polarization is worse than ever and getting worse not better. There is a Civil War coming if we don't stop dehumanizing those we disagree with politically." He echoed the same concern that a second civil war is possible on the Making Sense podcast with Sam Harris, stating high polarization on both sides "could end up being a new civil war that ends up bringing down our democracy as it currently exists." Yang later identified the winner-take-all two-party system as a driving force of polarization, stating it had put the nation at "literally civil war levels of political tension" that would lead to "violence and Civil War 2.0, which is frankly the path we're on right now."

During his inauguration, President Joe Biden called on the country to end the "uncivil war that pits red against blue, rural versus urban, conservative versus liberal," referring to the high polarization of American politics. In response to new voting restrictions enacted by conservative political leaders, Biden remarked that the country was facing "the worst challenge to our democracy since the Civil War." Biden, in private, was later quoted by a senior Democrat stating that: “I certainly hope [my presidency] works out. If it doesn’t, I’m not sure we’re going to have a country.”

On the first anniversary of the 2021 Capitol Attack, Former President Jimmy Carter warned that "our great nation now teeters on the brink of a widening abyss" and that "without immediate action, we are at genuine risk of civil conflict and losing our precious democracy." Carter blamed Trump, inaction by the Republican Party in the aftermath of the attack, and "promoters of the lie that the election was stolen" for stoking "distrust in our electoral systems." Carter noted that former Presidents Clinton, Bush and Obama had each "affirmed the legitimacy of the 2020 election" and condemned "relentless disinformation, which continues to turn Americans against Americans."

Rep. Jamie Raskin (D-Md.),a member of the United States House Select Committee on the January 6 Attack, classified the attack as an "inside coup" organized by Trump that could have triggered a civil war, stating: "It’s anybody’s guess what could have happened — martial law, civil war. You know, the beginning of authoritarianism. I want people to pay attention to what’s going on here, because that’s as close to fascism as I ever want my country to come to again."

Among the U.S. Military 

There has been growing concern among military leaders that a civil war could break out in the United States in the coming years.

Eight Former Secretaries of Defense and Five Former Chairmen of the Joint Chiefs of Staffs, including Trump's Secretary of Defense Mark Esper, penned an open letter in September, 2022 characterizing the political climate as an "exceptionally challenging civil-military environment," warning that the military had to "confront an extremely adverse environment characterized by the divisiveness of affective polarization that culminated in the first election in over a century when the peaceful transfer of political power was disrupted and in doubt." The letter was written because Pentagon leaders were "alarmed" by the Trump campaign's "rhetoric and ideas" in the 2020 election, including a never issued order for the military to seize voting machines. The open letter reaffirmed the military's neutrality in election outcomes, but warned that "could well get worse before they get better."

Former U.S. Generals Paul D. Eaton, Antonio M. Taguba and Steven M. Anderson stated together in a Washington Post op-ed that if Trump or a "Trumpian figure" contests the 2024 election there could be "lethal chaos inside our military", including a "total breakdown" into civil war. They state that "rogue [military] units" could pledge loyalty to the losing candidate, highlighting that 1 in 10 people charged in relation to the 2021 Capitol attack had a service record. They each urged the United States Department of Defense to begin conducting wargames for a 2024 insurrection or coup attempt. General Anderson later went on CNN to say that the threat of civil war lies within the U.S. military, not necessarily in its citizens, claiming "[some service members] think the president is something like a king" and are willing to defy the Constitution to follow "people like Trump", adding that such individuals should be identified, removed from service, and replaced by members who are loyal to Constitutional order.

Retired U.S. Army Col. and Iraq War veteran Peter Mansoor states such a scenario is plausible. Mansoor states "it would not be like the first Civil War, with armies maneuvering on the battlefield. I think it would very much be a free-for-all, neighbor on neighbor, based on beliefs and skin colors and religion. And it would be horrific."

International views 
Chilean newspaper El Mercurio, published in January 2022 an opinion column by Heraldo Muñoz (former Minister of Foreign Affairs of Chile; former Assistant Secretary-General, Assistant Administrator, and Regional Director for Latin America and the Caribbean of the United Nations Development Programme; and the former Chilean Ambassador to the United Nations, to Brazil, and to the Organization of American States), in which he discusses the possibility of a coup d'état in the next US presidential elections and says, "The specter of political violence is perceived to be rising." He mentions Trump's lies about the results of the 2020 elections, the support he has in the military and his following base, and the maneuvers of the Republican Party to decrease access to voting as elements that could lead to a generalized popular mistrust in future election's results. Muñoz says that situation is already considered as the start of a civil war by authors like Steven Levitsky and Daniel Ziblatt in their book How Democracies Die, Barton Gellman's The Atlantic's article Trump's Next Coup Has Already Begun, and the Zogby Analytics 2021 poll in which a 46% of voters believes a civil war is likely. In Muñoz's opinion, the subsequent "collapse of American democracy" would have "very negative consequences" for Chile and other countries. He reiterated those ideas in a follow-up column published in July 2022, after the first round of the January 6 hearings. On November 12, when 2022 midterm elections' results were still incomplete, Muñoz wrote: "American democracy is safe, for now; but the deep political and social divide in the US continues. The problem of an electoral tie in a polarized society is the possible recourse to violence instead of voting."

The general public's perception that a Second Civil War could erupt in the near future
Among the general public, there is considerable and growing concern that a Second American Civil War could erupt in the near future. Journalist Malcom Kyeyune summarizes the political climate by stating: "Talk of insurrection, secession, civil conflict and civil war is no longer the chatter of the gullible and the mentally ill. It's entering the fringes of polite society."

A 2018 Rasmussen poll, for instance, found that 31 percent of American voters feared that the intense partisanship following the 2016 presidential election and the victory of Donald Trump would cause a Second Civil War within five years, while a 2019 poll by the Georgetown Institute of Politics and Public Service revealed that "the average voter believes the U.S. is two-thirds of the way to the edge of a civil war". A Zogby Analytics poll in 2021 found that nearly half of likely voters (46 percent) considered a second civil war likely. Voters in the South felt a civil war was more likely when compared to other regions. The University of West Virginia's Center For Politics found that roughly 41% of Biden voters and 52% of Trump voters at least somewhat supported splitting the country from the union into liberal and conservative states. The same polling found that most voters saw everyday Americans who strongly support the opposing political party as either somewhat or very much a danger to society, and the majority of voters viewed political leaders of opposing parties as very much a danger. Research conducted by the University of Chicago in 2021 found that more than a fourth of adults agree that "the 2020 election was stolen, and Joe Biden is an illegitimate president" and approximately 9 percent of Americans felt that "use of force is justified to restore Donald J. Trump to the presidency." Researchers also concluded that belief in the Great Replacement and QAnon conspiracy theories were fueling much of the insurrectionist movement, and extrapolated that approximately 21 million Americans are prepared for violent conflict with the federal government.

Many Americans of both political parties saw the fallout of the 2020 election as a clear sign that "America is falling apart." Political scientist Eliot A. Cohen summarized this research by stating that most Americans are living under "the specter of civil war and the collapse of American democracy," but argues that American political institutions are stronger than most people credit them to be, and likens the cultural tension to the interwar period.

Research conducted in late 2021 by the Harvard Kennedy School found that a majority of young Americans (between the age of 18 to 29) viewed the United States in peril. The poll also found that a third of young Americans anticipated a Second American Civil War within their lifetime. Anticipation of a civil war was held mostly by young Republicans or young Americans who reside in rural or small town areas. A University of Maryland poll later found that 34 percent of Americans felt violent action against the government is justified (40 percent of Republicans, 41 percent of independents and 23 percent of Democrats).

Journalist David Smith summarizes the public perception of a civil war, by stating: "The mere fact that such notions are entering the public domain shows the once unthinkable has become thinkable, even though some would argue it remains firmly improbable." Meanwhile, Georgetown University's Institute of Politics and Public Service asked voters to rank political division in America on a 0-100 scale, with 100 representing "on the edge of a civil war." The mean response was 70.36. Other research indicates that between a third and a half of the country is anticipating a civil war in their lifetime, particularly among young, rural Americans who identify as Republican or conservative.

A May 2022 poll conducted by the University of Chicago Institute of Politics found that more than half of Americans think the government is corrupt, and more than a quarter (Strong Republicans 45%, Independents 35%, strong Democrats 21%, total 28%) agree with "it may be necessary at some point soon for citizens to take arms up against the government." In a TV interview the poll's conductors, Republican Neil Newhouse and Democrat Joel Benenson, attributed the situation to a "pandemic of mistrust between Americans and their government, and the media," and "partisanship and the media they consume." As the media are seen as partisan, this leads the public to rely on social media where their own views are reinforced.

Research from the University of California and the California Violence Research Center demonstrated that half of Americans "at least somewhat agree that a civil war will happen soon." Researchers said the conclusions were consistent with two years of polling, stating: "the motivating premises for this survey were that current conditions in the US create both perceived threats and actual threats to its future as a free and democratic society. The findings bear out both premises.”

Research regarding a Second Civil War 
Sociologist Jack Goldstone of George Mason University and quantitative historian Peter Turchin, using a predictive model for political instability, concluded in 2020 that the United States is "headed for civil war." The first prediction came in 2010 when Turchin cited stagnating or declining wages, income inequality, overproduction of young graduates with advanced degrees, and exploding public debt as predictors of civil war. Turchin reaffirmed the model's predictions in 2016 after the election of Trump, concluding that political instability would peak in the 2020s. As the model's predictions unfolded in 2020, Turchin said the predictions were vindicated and he also said that political trends in the U.S. are "strongly associated" with civil violence, summarizing the research by stating: "Our model shows there is plenty of dangerous tinder piled up and any spark could generate an inferno."

Meanwhile, researchers at the Brookings Institution countered that the outbreak of a civil war would be limited by several factors: a strong national rule of law, a lack of government-sponsored violence, no clear regional split, and likely conflict resolution through elections or public policy. However, the researchers suggested that an uptick in domestic terrorism and mass violence could occur, and they also stated that the outbreak of a civil war was not entirely impossible, concluding: "we should not assume it could not happen and ignore the ominous signs that conflict is spiraling out of control." Some observers have noted that recent interstate migration, fueled on the basis of state laws around issues like abortion and COVID-19-related mandates, is helping to create a more homogeneous blue versus red landscape that might help reinforce the perception of a forthcoming civil war or secession.

Writing for Foreign Policy, international relations scholar Monica Toft identified three elements that could lead to civil war in the United States in the coming years: the existence of a prior civil war, divided national identity on lines of "race, faith and class," and a "shift from tribalism to sectarianism." Toft states: "if one described them—fractured elites with competing narratives, deep-seated identity cleavages, and a politically polarized citizenry—without identifying the United States by name, most scholars of civil war would say, "Hey, that country is on the brink of a civil war."

Barbara F. Walter, a political scientist who sits on the Political Instability Task Force, claimed that quantitative and qualitative predictive modeling, used by the research project to forecast civil wars in foreign countries, showed that the United States is facing "conditions that make civil war likely." Walter claimed the two most predictive factors of civil war include:

 If that country is an anocracy (also called semi- or partial democracy), a weak democracy, or an illiberal democracy.
 If at least one political party experiences ethnic factionalism and begins to organize on identity such as race, religion and ethnicity (as opposed to policy), and that party, perceiving an existential disadvantage in free elections, sought to implement minority rule through non-democratic means.

Walter claims both apply to the modern United States:

 Trump's attempts to overturn the 2020 election downgraded the nation into the "middle-ground" between democracy and autocracy, citing research by the Center for Systematic Peace, a think-tank that researches political violence.
 The homogeneity of voters who support the Republican Party, which is composed of 80-90 percent white Evangelicals, and an attempt by that party to cement minority rule in a multicultural and multi-faith nation because the size of their voting base is no longer large enough to win elections (due in part to white decline).

Republican presidential candidates have only won the popular vote once since 1988. Walter claims that white male Republican candidates will continue to underperform in national elections because of an increasingly multicultural one-person one-vote society. She also states that leaders within the Republican Party recognize that they "no longer benefit from democracy" and must now seek non-democratic ways to retain power.

Some data analysts have questioned if the Republican Party is coalescing around white conservative Christians, pointing to inroads with the Latino population in the 2020 Presidential Election. Walter claims inroads by Republicans with other demographics are nominal, and that the Republican party has become a "whites-only" party ever since the passage of the Civil Rights Act in 1964.

Walter concludes that "every year we don't reform our democracy and make it stronger... every year that we have one of our two major parties appealing to only one segment of our society: the white Christian population, [and] every year that those two factors continue to exist, our risk [of civil war] increases." Walter adds that "full liberal democracies don't have civil wars," claiming predictive modeling places the possibility of a civil war in countries similar to the United States at among the highest: an annual risk of 3.4%. Noting some might perceive that number as "small," Walter states that the risk rate will increase annually if systematic problems remain unaddressed, likening the risk of civil war to the annual risk increase of lung cancer for every year a smoker doesn't quit smoking.

Walter summarizes her interpretation of the data by stating: "if you were an analyst in a foreign country looking at events in America – the same way you'd look at events in Ukraine or Ivory Coast or Venezuela – you would go down a checklist" and "what you would find is that the United States ... has entered very dangerous territory." Walter compares the current political framework of the United States to partial democracies such as Ecuador, Somalia, or Haiti, and falls short of full democracies like Norway, Switzerland, or Iceland. Journalist David J. Remnick agrees with Walter's assessment, stating the grim suspension "between democracy and autocracy" creates an uncertain political future that "radically heightens the likelihood of episodic bloodletting in America, and even the risk of civil war."

Carl Bernstein also claims Trump has driven fear in Christians, stating: "Whatever you say about Trump, 45, damn near 50% of the people who vote, voted for him and – you look at the surveys – some 35% of people who voted for Trump believe Christianity is being taken away from them. The idea that the Trump base is some narrow group of white men with guns? Bullshit. This is a huge movement including misogynistic women, including racists of every kind, but also including all kinds of educated people in cities and suburbs. It's also a movement against liberalism, against what the Democratic party in their view has come to represent. It's about race, all kinds of forces, people’s idea of what the United States ought to be. This movement embraces autocracy, authoritarianism, a peculiarly American neo-fascism which Trump represents."

Political scientist Julie Novkov notes that, while a similar political climate existed prior to the American Civil War, "the compromise that ended Reconstruction may begin to look like a plausible way out: leaving states to develop and implement policies based on the world views of those who control their dominant parties, with all that that could mean for those living there," often resulting in a constitutional crisis and minority rule, but not a "shooting war." Meanwhile, Boston College professor Heather Cox Richardson suggested that Biden could find an out by rallying the divided country by declaring "war on the authoritarians threatening our democracy, much the same as Abraham Lincoln did." Some interpreted these remarks as unfairly comparing modern Republicans to slaveowners prior to the Civil War.

Among investors 

Notably, there has also been some discussion of a civil war among financial investors on Wall Street. In 2021, billionaire hedge fund manager Ray Dalio began warning of "some form" of future civil war. Dalio placed the chance of a civil war in America in the next 5 to 10 years at 30%, citing "bad financial conditions and intense conflict." Dalio says there is a "dangerously high risk" of government breakdown between the state and federal levels that won't go through the "rulebook" of The Constitution, creating a "power conflict that could take it's various forms." Dalio added that "history has taught is that when the causes that people are behind are more important to them than the system, the system is in jeopardy."  In 2022, Dalio authored an article on Linkedin, echoing his prior concerns, stating: "The current financial conditions and irreconcilable differences in desires and values are consistent with the ingredients leading to some form of civil war." Dalio blames bad financial conditions caused by increasing federal debt, high taxes, inflation, and wealth inequality, which has created discontentment among Americans that is being further aggravated by misinformation, propaganda, and populist movements on the left and right. Dalio warns the 2022 midterms will worsen the political environment because "extremist-populists will win because each side wants fighters, not compromisers, and moderates will also choose not to run."

Criticism of discussion about a "Second Civil War" 
There has been some backlash from some political scientists and commentators regarding discussion of a second civil war. Observers claim the incendiary nature of the topic in the mainstream could demonize conservatives, or act as a "self-fulfilling prophecy." Other critics claim the term "civil war" is being misused.

As a form of fearmongering which is intended to demonize conservatives 
Several conservative thinkers have criticized mainstream discussion about a civil war, generally claiming that it serves as a form of fearmongering which is intended to demonize conservatives. Some of them have claimed that the discussion about a civil war is an intentional conspiracy which is designed to instill fear and help the federal government justify its suspension of the American people's civil rights.

Writing for the Manhattan Institute for Policy Research, a conservative think tank in New York, Lee Seigel argues that the discussion about a second civil war is "hyperbolic" and essentially impossible given current conditions, claiming that America is facing an epistemological crisis rather than an existential one. Seigel argues that in order for a civil war to occur, two separate armies would need to be ready to wage war against each other, and he also argues that no true existential threat actually exists against any group of Americans, but he warns: "We should be careful how we use such a term, lest fears of political catastrophe become self-fulfilling prophecies."

Ross Douthat, a Political analyst for The New York Times, recognized the fact that political polarization is increasing, but he blamed liberals for exaggerating the fear of a civil war, especially in the aftermath of the Gretchen Whitmer kidnapping plot. Conservative author Steven F. Hayward echoed this sentiment, stating that the Democratic Party is exaggerating the fear of a civil war as a political attack against conservatives, claiming: "If a new civil war does come, it will be on account of the intransigence of the same party that started the first one."

Meanwhile, conservative columnist John Feehery claims that left-wing politicians are exaggerating the fear of a "phony" civil war in order to enact "self-serving" voting laws that would make it easier for them to win elections. Essayist Michael Anton, a senior fellow at the Claremont Institute and former Trump official, went further, claiming a manufactured fear of civil war is being promoted by the mainstream media as a means of psychological manipulation to help the deep state "crush opposition" from conservatives. Anton claims such lies serve as a pretext for the federal government to clampdown on political opponents and impose "censorship, surveillance, no-knock raids, computer and records seizures, asset confiscation, frivolous (but deadly serious) criminal charges, endless pretrial detention, and draconian sentences for misdemeanors and noncrimes."

The misuse of the term "Second Civil War" 

Fintan O'Toole, recalling discussion of an Irish Civil War during The Troubles, states that characterizing modern political turbulence in the U.S. as an emerging civil war is a "failure of historical perspective," while historian Gary W. Gallagher states that such characterization "represents a spectacular lack of understanding about American history" and that the country will "almost certainly will emerge from current controversies intact." Nikhil Pal Singh  of  New York University claims "the spectre of civil war" is a mislabeling of "endemic" violence and illiberal fatalism, adding that the "politics of anticipatory fear has served up a long, dismal record of misdiagnosing fundamental problems."

O'Toole points to historical events, such as the American Indian Wars, the Tulsa race massacre, the Martin Luther King, Jr. assassination riots, and the 1992 Los Angeles riots as examples of heightened political tension that did not spark a civil war in America. O'Toole says modern violence is similar to these events and unlikely to trigger civil war, stating: "The comforting fiction that the U.S. used to be a glorious and settled democracy prevents any reckoning with the fact that its current crisis is not a terrible departure from the past but rather a product of the unresolved contradictions of its history."  Marche disagrees, maintaining that the legitimacy of U.S. institutions, including the courts, press and Congress, is "in freefall" and can't be compared to prior social upheaval because an "incipient illegitimacy crisis" is being pushed by the political right, which is causing conservatives to "abandoned faith in government." Marche concludes: "The United States today is, once again, headed for civil war, and, once again, it cannot bear to face it."

Political analyst Lincoln Mitchell argues that "casual talk" of a second civil war is unhelpful because most Americans "may miss its arrival," stating there won't be a clear moment such as the shooting at Fort Sumter, but rather a "chaotic" escalation of violence similar to what occurred during the George Floyd protests and the 2021 Capitol attack. Mitchell also adds that "casual talk of a national divorce" or peaceful secession is "absurd," adding: "the cost of breaking up America would be extremely high for all of us."

American University associate professor Thomas Zeitzoff also objects to the conversation because it "could be self-fulfilling," noting that "paying acute attention to the danger might make the danger more likely." He also notes that statistical analysis is likely overstating the tolerance for violence by everyday American citizens, triggering unnecessary panic. Ron Elving for NPR summarizes this by stating: "too much thinking about the unthinkable can become acceptance of the unacceptable."

Zeitzoff also notes that "civil war" has a scholarly definition as "a high-intensity conflict, often involving regular armed forces, that is sustained, organized and large-scale" and is an "extreme manifestation of political violence" beyond anything exhibited in the modern United States, and includes measurable benchmarks such as total battle deaths and duration of conflict. Therefore, the accepted definition of a civil war undermines any conversation of "civil war" being used in the mainstream. Others note that most civil wars are based on a certain threshold of combatant deaths, often 1,000 or more.

Dartmouth political science professor Brendan Nyhan agrees, arguing the term "civil war" is being used interchangeably with "threat to democracy" and distracts from actual political crises such as a rise in authoritarianism. Politico co-founder John F. Harris argues that the misuse of civil war in the national dialogue should give "solace" for the future, claiming that everyday Americans are contemptuous of each other but with "no one really knowing what the conflict is about." Without a real unifying cause to fight for or against (such as slavery), Harris concludes that the political environment is akin to a "national crack-up," adding: "it's hard to have a real civil war without a real cause." Gallagher agrees, stating: "No political issue in 2022 approaches slavery in terms of potential explosiveness."

Musa al-Gharbi, a fellow at the Sociology at Columbia University, said the fear of civil war is "overblown" and is "almost purely an artifact of people taking poll and survey data at face value despite overwhelming evidence that we probably shouldn't." Al-Gharbi noted a decrease in political violence in 2021, stating: "In fact, rather than January 6 serving as a prelude to a civil war, the US saw lower levels of death from political violence in 2021 than in any other year since the turn of the century. Even as violent crime approached record highs across much of the country, fatalities from political violence dropped. This is not an outcome that seems consistent with large and growing shares of the population supposedly leaning towards settling the culture wars with bullets instead of ballots."

Writing in socialist magazine Jacobin, journalist Ryan Zickgraf was critical of Marche and Walter for stoking civil war anxiety, which he claimed "isn't just overblown — it's also politically useless," stating: "Ultimately, we don't need the threat of a civil war to stay vigilant. It's possible to be alarmed by Trump's behind-the-scenes attempts to overturn the election and right-wing authoritarian movements whose increasingly violent antigovernmental arguments are becoming more mainstream in the Republican Party without hitting the panic button. Not every act of rebellion, even one as cinematic as a horned barbarian at the gates of Congress, signals The End of the Republic."

Barbara F. Walter is critical of civil war skeptics, stating: "What everybody said, whether they were in Baghdad or Sarajevo or Kiev, was we didn't see it coming. In fact, we weren't willing to accept that anything was wrong until we heard machine gun fire in the hillside. And by that time, it was too late."

In international media
In June 2022, Deutsche Welle, the German state-owned international broadcaster, aired a 42 min. segment titled Abortion, guns, racism: Is America a worn-out role model? [Abtreibung, Waffen, Rassismus: Haben die USA als Vorbild ausgedient?]. The first 22 min. were about the overturning of Roe v. Wade and the growing conservatism of the Supreme Court; mins. 22-30 were about gun violence and how the ownership of guns is seen by the American people; mins. 30-38 were about the events of January 6, 2021 and the possibility of Trump or the Republicans returning to power in an electoral structure in which someone who does not have a popular majority can win. In the final minutes, the host asked the guests about whether the USA is still a role model of democracy. Ms. Roig said that given its historical record of human rights violations it had never been one. Mr. Braml said that considering one-third of Republican lawmakers and voters don't recognize Biden as a legitimate president, they think guns can be used to defend what they view as a democracy, and they have many guns, something alike or worse than January 6 could happen, including drifting into a civil war ["Amerika in einem Bürgerkrieg abdriften könnte," min.41:06]. Ms. Renvert said that the USA's innovation, universities and educated people are still attracting the young from around the world.

In popular culture

Literature
 The short story The Impossible Life and The Possible Death Of Preston J. Cole from Halo Evolutions refers to the historical civil war as the first American Civil War, hinting at least one other civil war broke out between then and the time of the story.
 In the semi-satirical 1935 political novel by American author Sinclair Lewis, It Can't Happen Here, a second civil war breaks out due to the tyrannical policies of fictional President Berzelius "Buzz" Windrip. Published during the rise of fascism in Europe, the novel describes the rise of Windrip, a politician who defeats Franklin Delano Roosevelt (FDR) and is elected President of the United States, after fomenting fear and promising drastic economic and social reforms while promoting a return to patriotism and "traditional" values. After his election, Windrip takes complete control of the government and imposes a plutocratic/totalitarian rule with the help of a ruthless paramilitary force, in the manner of Adolf Hitler and the SS. The novel's plot centers on journalist Doremus Jessup's opposition to the new regime and his subsequent struggle against it as part of a liberal rebellion. Reviewers at the time, and literary critics since, have emphasized the connection with Louisiana politician Huey Long, who was preparing to run for president in the 1936 election when he was assassinated in 1935 just prior to the novel's publication.
 Philip K. Dick's 1974 novel, Flow My Tears, the Policeman Said is set in a futuristic dystopia, where the United States has become a police state in the aftermath of a Second Civil War. The story follows a genetically enhanced pop singer and television star who wakes up in a world where he has never existed.
 In Canadian author Margaret Atwood's 1985 dystopian novel, The Handmaid's Tale, a secretive group of religious fundamentalists called "The Sons of Jacob" stages an attack that kills the U.S. president and most of Congress. In the ensuing political and social upheaval, the group launches a hostile revolution and suspends the United States Constitution under the pretext of restoring order. Within this autocratic new system, the group is quickly able to curtail or take away human, civil, and in particular women's rights. Under their newfound authority, The Sons of Jacob declare the establishment of The Republic of Gilead — a theocratic military dictatorship within the borders of what was formerly the United States of America. The new regime moves quickly to consolidate its power and reorganize society with an Old Testament-inspired social and religious fanaticism, and enshrines in law a militarized, hierarchical system of newly created societal classes and cultural castes. At the same time, the Gileadian army continues to fight a Second American Civil War against various factions who oppose the new regime. The novel primarily takes place 16 years after the events that occurred during the establishment of Gilead, and depicts a grim picture of society, where pollution caused by nuclear and biological issues have caused near-universal infertility and a sharp rise in birth defects, where women are subjugated and valued only for their reproductive capacities, and where minorities of every stripe are persecuted.
 In 1993, author David Aikman wrote When the Almond Tree Blossoms, a novel describing a second American Civil War. The book detailed an account of an east–west divide following a U.S. defeat and surrender following a battle in the Middle East. The two sides, The Constitutionalists and People's Movement are locked in a bitter fight. A sequel to the book is currently under development by Aikman.
 In the 1995 alternate history/time travel novel ARC Riders by David Drake and Janet Morris, the United States is on the verge of collapse and possible nuclear civil war due to over two decades of harsh military rule as a result of the ARC Raiders meddling with the Vietnam War.
 In the 1997 alternate history novel Back in the USSA by Eugene Byrne and Kim Newman, a Second American Civil War and a Second American Revolution occur as a result of the corrupt presidency of Charles Foster Kane, who becomes the 28th president after former president and Progressive Party candidate Theodore Roosevelt wins the 1912 presidential election, but is assassinated on December 19, 1912, before taking office by the sharpshooter and exhibition shooter Annie Oakley when he personally attempts to break up a labor strike at the Chicago Union Stock Yards with the help of the Rough Riders. Due to his being Roosevelt's running mate, Kane becomes president on March 4, 1913. By 1917, the U.S. becomes unstable politically and socially. That year, the Socialist Party led by Eugene Debs gains increasing support and both a Second American Civil War and Second American Revolution (both based on the Russian Civil War and Russian Revolution, respectively) breaks out, following which Kane is ousted from the White House, overthrown, and executed for treason. The United States becomes the United Socialist States of America (USSA) with Debs as its president, surviving until his death in 1926.
 In the 2002 short story "Southern Strategy" by Michael F. Flynn that is collected in the anthology Alternate Generals II by Harry Turtledove, a shortened World War I leaves the German Empire a world power in the 20th century, while the United States all but collapses during a genocide-based second civil war.
 In the 2002 novel A Disturbance of Fate by Mitchell J. Freedman, in which Robert F. Kennedy survives the attempt on his life, Governor Barry Sadler of Arizona wins the 1984 United States presidential election. Sadler's anti-union actions lead to a general strike, which Sadler's reaction escalates into a civil war.
 In one of the timelines in the 2003 novel Fuzzy Dice by Paul Di Filippo, George McGovern is narrowly elected president in 1972 after incumbent Richard Nixon had undergone an assassination attempt and become completely paranoid, waging a crackdown on real and imagined domestic foes as well as a huge escalation of the Vietnam War, and setting off a huge explosion of countrywide riots. The riots continue and even increase after McGovern's election and a call by the new president for a return to calm proves completely ineffective. McGovern rejects a call in Congress to use the Army to quell the riots, leading to an attempted impeachment. Some military commanders try repression on their own, killing civilians and only adding to the ferocity of the riots. Eventually, the country is plunged into chaos, an all-out Second American Civil War, and eventually the total collapse of the Old Order. When the book's protagonist arrives some decades later, he finds a "Hippie-style" dictatorship presided over by the monstrous Lady Sunshine and with Hells Angels acting as the police, and the final fate of McGovern is unknown.
 Empire by Orson Scott Card is a 2006 novel set in a near-future US (implied to be 2008) where after the President and Vice President are assassinated, civil war breaks out. A left-wing group called the Progressive Restoration rises up, seeking to reverse change since George W. Bush's election, with the main characters becoming involved in the conflict. The novel is a tie-in to the Shadow Complex video game, with Hidden Empire following in 2009.
 In the 2012 novel by Billy Bennett titled By Force of Arms (part of a series by the author focusing on a victorious Confederacy), the United States (led by William Tecumseh Sherman) and the Confederate States (led by Robert E. Lee) fight "The Second American Civil War" in 1869 due to Confederate and French military involvement in Mexico, with fighting spreading across the two countries from ironclads firing at each other in the Gulf of California, trench warfare in the Confederate state of Virginia, Buffalo Soldiers fighting in the west, pro-Confederate bushwhacker partisans in the Union state of Missouri made even more deadly by the usage of the introduction of breech-loading rifles and Gatling guns.
 The 2013 novel Pulse by Patrick Carman depicts a Second Civil War, escalating into a nuclear disaster, leaving only one area of land habitable, divided into 2 states constantly at war.
 American War, the 2017 debut novel by Omar El Akkad, is told from the viewpoint of members of the Chestnut family who have experienced the War first-hand. The War begins in 2074, when anthropogenic climate change has led to a ban on fossil fuels, leading to the secession of several Southern states. The events of the novel themselves are influenced by widespread plagues, and culture wars over increased immigration of Muslims.
 Tropic of Kansas, the 2017 debut novel by Christopher Brown, is told from the points of view of Sig, an orphan running from the law, and Tania, a government investigator forced to hunt him. The two are foster brother and sister. In this setting, the US has broken into warring factions, with most of the action taking place in a new wasteland in the Midwest.

Film

 The 1996 film Barb Wire, based upon the 1994 comic book of the same name, is set in 2017 during the "Second American Civil War". Titular heroine Barb Wire (Pamela Anderson) owns the Hammerhead, a nightclub in Steel Harbor — "the last free city" in a United States ravaged by the civil war—and she brings in extra cash working as a mercenary and bounty hunter.
 The Second Civil War: a 1997 made-for-TV movie wherein the title conflict erupts over immigration, with the country having become inundated with immigrants and refugees, and the president attempting to settle more refugees in a resistant Idaho.
 The 2005 film adaptation of V for Vendetta mentions an ongoing civil war in the United States, with fighting said to be devastating the midwest. The war, combined with a plague, allegedly cripples the country to the point where its government petitions to the United Kingdom for medical supplies. However, both reports come from the fascist Norsefire regime's propaganda sources in the United Kingdom, leaving the existence of the war in question.
 The 2017 film Bushwick set in the New York City neighborhood of the same name, deals with mysterious invaders. It is later revealed that the invaders are mercenaries sent by a Texas-led coalition comprised by Southern states seeking to secede from the US.
 The 2019 film In the Shadow of the Moon set in Philadelphia is a sci-fi thriller about the death of several people at different points in time. It is later revealed that the deaths were targeted killings to prevent another civil war.
The 2021 film The Forever Purge shows the United States of America in a civil war state between military forces and a white supremacist group referred as the "Forever" Purgers.

Television
 In season two of the 2006 TV series Jericho, a second American Civil War begins between the United States and the separatist Allied States of America. Members within the US government conspire to bomb 23 American cities in order to kill the President and other heads of Government. After the power grid is knocked out, new leaders organize and make a new government called the Allied States of America, which occupy everything West of the Mississippi River, excluding Texas, which becomes independent. Everything east belongs to the remaining United States. The Allied States leaders frame Iran and North Korea for the attacks, and subsequently nuke the two countries. The new government gradually transforms into an oppressive and authoritarian fascist regime. Civil war begins when it is revealed that leaders within the Allied States of America were ring leaders of the previous attacks on American cities. In the sequel comic book series, the Allied States launches a devastating invasion of Texas, presumably defeating the country. Despite this, the war with the United States and rebels in Allied territory continues.
 In the Family Guy episode "Back to the Pilot", Brian travels back in time to 1999 and tells his younger self to prevent the September 11 attacks. By doing so, George W. Bush is unable to exploit fears of terrorism and secure re-election. After losing the 2004 election, Bush reforms the Confederacy and declares war on the United States, resulting in a post-apocalyptic future.
 A pilot film for a proposed TV drama, Civil, about a disputed election that slides into civil unrest and eventually war, was optioned by TNT in 2016. However TNT decided not to proceed as it was felt to be too close to home for the 2016 U.S. presidential election.
 The 2022 TV series DMZ takes place in the aftermath of the evacuation of Manhattan during a second American Civil War.
 "Strange New Worlds", the 2022 pilot episode of Star Trek: Strange New Worlds, reveals that 23rd-century historians consider the Second Civil War to have already begun in the early 2020s.

Video games
 The Deus Ex video game series, first released in 2000, depict a United States reshaped by what is called the "Northwest War", where several states secede from the union due to an unpopular gun control law and increasing dissent with the federal government. The main antagonists for the first act of the game, the National Secession Forces, are descended from the Northwest Secession Forces who fought the United States during the war, although the newer NSF is more kin to a left-wing populist movement, and the original was more akin to a right-wing militia.
 Shattered Union, a 2005 video game published by 2K Games, depicts a civil war between six factions of the former United States and the European Union, following the destruction of Washington, D.C. in a nuclear attack.
 The science-fiction, action-roleplaying, third-person shooter Mass Effect series, first released in 2007, has this subject in its backstory, spawning from the creation of the United North American States.

See also
 American decline
 American militia movement
 List of active separatist movements in North America
 Names of the American Civil War
 Neo-Confederate
 Origins of the American Civil War
 Patriot movement
 Political polarization in the United States
 Radical right (United States)
 Secession in the United States
 Second American Revolution
 Terrorism in the United States
 Domestic terrorism in the United States

References
http://www.scielo.org.za/scielo.php?script=sci_arttext&pid=S2223-03862013000200010&lng=en&nrm=iso

Further reading

 
Fictional wars
Possible future wars
Boogaloo movement
Theories of history